You Never Know Who Your Friends Are is the second solo album by American multi-instrumentalist Al Kooper, issued in 1969 on Columbia Records.

Background

Kooper wasted no time recording this album, coming just seven months after his debut release. It is a continuation of sorts of his debut; the album contains another eclectic mix of rock, rhythm and blues, jazz, pop, and blues, though without the psychedelics that had somewhat permeated through I Stand Alone. Utilizing a large group of musicians under the direction of Charlie Calello, known collectively as "The Al Kooper Big Band", Kooper also strayed away from the heavy string orchestrations of his debut.

Relying on more original compositions, with nine of twelve tracks by Kooper, and the remaining three by Harry Nilsson and Motown Records staff songwriters, the album further helped to cement Kooper's reputation. The album reached #125 on the Billboard 200 on October 25, 1969, and was on the charts for six weeks.

Track listing
All tracks composed by Al Kooper; except where indicated

 "Magic in My Socks" – (3:55)
 "Lucille" – (3:24)
 "Too Busy Thinkin' 'bout My Baby" (Norman Whitfield, Janie Bradford – 3:20)
 "First Time Around" – (2:48)
 "Loretta (Union Turnpike Eulogy)" – (3:48)
 "Blues, Part IV" – (5:04)
 "You Never Know Who Your Friends Are" – (2:53)
 "The Great American Marriage / Nothing" – (3:19)
 "I Don't Know Why I Love You" (Lula Mae Hardaway, Don Hunter, Paul Riser, Stevie Wonder – 3:22)
 "Mourning Glory Story" (Harry Nilsson – 2:16)
 "Anna Lee (What Can I Do for You)" – (3:18)
 "I'm Never Gonna Let You Down" – (4:37)
 "Bloodtrocuted" – (3:36) CD remastered bonus track

Personnel

Musicians
Al Kooper – piano, organ, guitar, ondioline, vocals, arrangements
With The Al Kooper Big Band under the direction of Charlie Calello
Ralph Casale, Stu Scharf, Eric Gale – guitars 
Ernie Hayes, Paul Griffin, Frank Owens – piano, organ
Walter Sears – Moog synthesizer
Chuck Rainey, Jerry Jemmott, John Miller – electric bass
Bernard "Pretty" Purdie, Al Rogers – drums
Bernie Glow, Ernie Royal, Marvin Stamm – trumpets
Ray Desio, Jimmy Knepper, Bill Watrous, Tony Studd – trombones 
George Young, Sol Schlinger, Seldon Powell, Joe Farrell – saxophones 
Hilda Harris, Connie Zimet, Albertine Robinson, Lois Winter, Michael Gately, Lou Christie, Robert John, Charlie Calello – backing vocals

Technical
Al Kooper – producer
Glen Kolotkin, Roy Segal, Stan Tonkel – engineers
Ron Coro – cover art direction and design

References

1969 albums
Columbia Records albums
Al Kooper albums
Albums arranged by Charles Calello
Albums produced by Al Kooper